Strada statale 44 del Passo di Giovo (SS 44) is a motorway which connects Etschtal (Valle dell'Adige) with Eisacktal (Valle Isarco) passing through Passeier Valley and Jaufen Valley.

It originates in Merano from the Strada statale 38 dello Stelvio and ends in Sterzing joining the Strada statale 12 dell'Abetone e del Brennero. The road, detached from the SS 38 dello Stelvio, goes up Passeier Valley up to St. Leonhard in Passeier; here begins the ascent to Jaufen Pass, whence the name, where it reaches its maximum altitude. The stretch between St. Leonhard in Passeier and Sterzing was built by the Austrian military in 1912. From here, the road descends to Jaufen Valley until it joins SS 12 del Brennero.

In St. Leonhard in Passeier, the main valley branches off to the north-west, through which the SS 44 bis continues, leading to Timmelsjoch and to the border with the Austria.

References 

44 bis
Transport in South Tyrol